UFC 48: Payback was a mixed martial arts event held by the Ultimate Fighting Championship on June 19, 2004, at the Mandalay Bay Events Center in Las Vegas, Nevada. The event was broadcast live on pay-per-view in the United States, and was later released on DVD.

History
The featured contestants of the evening were Ken Shamrock and Kimo Leopoldo, who had met once before in 1996 in a UFC title fight at UFC 8, with Shamrock reigning victorious. The event was very successful, as it drew more pay per view buys than the highly anticipated match between Chuck Liddell and Tito Ortiz one event earlier at UFC 47.

Results

Fighter Payout
The total fighter payroll for UFC 48 was $586,000.
Ken Shamrock: $170,000 ($120,000 to fight; $50,000 to win)
Matt Hughes: $110,000 ($55,000 to fight; $55,000 to win)
Frank Mir: $90,000 ($60,000 to fight; $30,000 to win)
Kimo Leopoldo: $55,000
Tim Sylvia: $40,000
Evan Tanner: $30,000 ($15,000 to fight; $15,000 to win)
Phil Baroni: $20,000
Frank Trigg: $20,000 ($10,000 to fight; $10,000 to win)
Matt Serra: $16,000 ($8,000 to fight; $8,000 to win)
Renato Verissimo: $10,000
Georges St-Pierre: $8,000 ($4,000 to fight; $4,000 to win)
Trevor Prangley: $5,000 ($2,500 to fight; $2,500 to win)
Dennis Hallman: $4,000
Curtis Stout: $3,000
Jay Hieron: $3,000
Ivan Menjivar: $2,000

See also 
 Ultimate Fighting Championship
 List of UFC champions
 List of UFC events
 2004 in UFC

References

External links
Official UFC past events page

Ultimate Fighting Championship events
2004 in mixed martial arts
Mixed martial arts in Las Vegas
2004 in sports in Nevada